Mister Slime (known as Mr Slime in Australia and Mr. Slime Jr. in Europe) is a side-scrolling platform game by French studio Lexis Numerique that was released in 2008. The game was designed by Paul Cuisset, the former lead designer of Delphine Software International and the creator of Flashback.

Plot
The eponymous main character must protect the Slime Village from the evil enemy Axons.

Gameplay
The stylus is used to pull Mister Slime's four elastic arms to different anchor points spread throughout the levels.  On top of that, players are able to send Mister Slime flying on a gust of wind and provide him air bubbles underwater.  Both functions are executed by the player blowing into the system's built-in microphone.

The presentation is comparable to LocoRoco or World of Goo with physics that feature and bouncing characters. Also similar to both games is the characteristic elasticity playing an important role in the core gameplay.

Reception

The game received "mixed" reviews according to the review aggregation website Metacritic.

References

External links

2008 video games
Nintendo DS games
Nintendo DS-only games
Platform games
SouthPeak Games
Video games developed in France
Multiplayer and single-player video games
Lexis Numérique games